Romain Pastorelli (born 25 March 1983 in Cagnes-sur-Mer) is a French professional footballer who currently plays for AS Furiani-Agliani in Championnat National 2. He previously played professionally for CA Bastia in Ligue 2

Club career
Pastorelli started his career in the French lower leagues, mainly playing in the South of France. In 2013, he gained promotion to the Ligue 2 with CA Bastia, while becoming the top scorer in the league.

He then made his professional debut in August 2013, in an away defeat against Lens. His first professional goal came two games later, on 16 August 2013, when he converted a penalty in the 1–1 draw at FC Istres.

Pastorelli moved to Corsican amateur side AS Furiani-Agliani on 8 November 2014.

References

External links
 
 
 

1983 births
Living people
French footballers
Championnat National players
Ligue 2 players
Gazélec Ajaccio players
SO Cassis Carnoux players
CA Bastia players
Association football midfielders